Medetsiz Mountain is a summit in Toros Mountains range of Turkey.

Toros Mountains run parallel to the Mediterranean Sea in south Turkey. It is a part of Çamlıyayla (ilçe) (district) of Mersin Province. The north of the submit is a high cliff and the ramp to the south is relatively more gentle. It is one of the popular tracks of the mountaineers.

References

Landforms of Mersin Province
Çamlıyayla District
Mountains of Turkey
Taurus Mountains
Three-thousanders of Turkey